Nolambur is the neighbourhood in the western part of Chennai. It is near to the Poonamallee High Road near Maduravoyal, Mogappair West, Ambattur, Ayanambakkam, and Athipet.

Road access from the north is from Mogappair and Ambattur Industrial Estate. Nolambur is located adjacent to Maduravoyal and Nerkundram, which are situated at its south boundaries. Bharathi Salai and its continuation Nolambur Phase II road are 70 ft wide. They form the primary route of travelling for the residents nearby. The Inner ring road runs in the western fringes of Nolambur making it a place for rapid connectivity from all part of Chennai City. A few buses also ply through this area.

Important Residential units include Brigade Xanadu, S and P Garden, Jains Sunderbans Apartments,Fomra Tribhuvan, VGN Minerva Apartments, Akshya Pacific City, City Light Meadows, DABC's various apartments and Jains Nakshatra.

Schools 
 DAV Group of Schools
 Velammal Group of Schools
 Dawn School
 Green Valley Matriculation & Higher Secondary School
 Schram Academy
 Spartan School
 Sri Chaitanya
 Aachi Global School,
 Birla Open Minds International School

See also
 Ambattur
 Maduravoyal
 Mogappair
 Ayappakkam

References

Neighbourhoods in Chennai